Xenohammus albomaculatus is a species of beetle in the family Cerambycidae. It was described by Wang and Chiang in 2000. It is known from China.

References

Lamiini
Beetles described in 2000